Australphilus is a genus of beetles in the family Dytiscidae, containing the following species:

 Australphilus montanus Watts, 1978
 Australphilus saltus Watts, 1978

References

Dytiscidae